Hans Traut (25 January 1895 – 9 December 1974) was a German general during World War II. He was a recipient of the Knight's Cross of the Iron Cross with Oak Leaves of Nazi Germany.

Traut surrendered to the Red Army troops in the course of the Soviet 1944 Vitebsk–Orsha Offensive. In 1947 he was convicted as a war criminal in the Soviet Union and sentenced to 25 years of forced labor. Traut was released in 1955.

Awards and decorations
 Iron Cross (1914) 2nd Class (21 October 1914) & 1st Class (17 January 1917)
 Clasp to the Iron Cross (1939) 2nd Class (20 September 1939) & 1st Class (4 October 1939)
 Knight's Cross of the Iron Cross with Oak Leaves
 Knight's Cross on 5 August 1940 as Oberstleutnant and commander of I./Infanterie-Regiment 90
 Oak Leaves on 23 January 1942 as Oberst and commander of Infanterie-Regiment 41 (mot.) and leader of 10th Infantry Division
 German Cross in Gold on 15 December 1943 as Generalleutnant and commander of the 78th Sturm Division

References

Citations

Bibliography

1895 births
1974 deaths
German Army personnel of World War I
German prisoners of war in World War II held by the Soviet Union
Lieutenant generals of the German Army (Wehrmacht)
People from Alsace-Lorraine
People from Sarreguemines
Prussian Army personnel
Recipients of the clasp to the Iron Cross, 1st class
Recipients of the Gold German Cross
Recipients of the Knight's Cross of the Iron Cross with Oak Leaves
Reichswehr personnel
German Army generals of World War II